Peter French (1849–1897) was a cattle baron from Oregon.

Pete or Peter French may also refer to:

Peter French (Dominican) (died 1693), Irish theologian
Peter A. French (born 1942), American philosopher and writer
Pete French, singer in the bands Leaf Hound, Atomic Rooster and Cactus

See also 
Pete French Round Barn, a round barn in Oregon named after Peter French the cattle baron
Peter Ffrench (1844–1929), Irish politician
French Pete Trail, a wilderness trail in Oregon